The Lempor ejector is a steam locomotive exhaust system developed by noted Argentine locomotive engineer Livio Dante Porta. The ejector's name is a portmanteau of the names of Porta and Belgian locomotive engineer Maurice Lemaître. The Lempor ejector follows the principles of the de Laval nozzle.

Operation
In a steam locomotive, draft is produced in the firebox by exhausting the steam coming from the cylinders into the Chimney via a  nozzle or 'blast pipe' this creates a vacuum in the Smokebox. The Lempor ejector is a development of similar multiple orifice/nozzle ejectors which create either a stronger vacuum or the same vacuum more efficiently by presenting less 'back pressure' or resistance to the exhausting cylinder.

Results
The Lempor exhaust is claimed to deliver a 100% improvement in draughting capacity over traditional exhaust systems and a 40% increase in ejector performance.

References

External links
Lempor Exhaust on The Ultimate Steam Page.

Locomotive parts
Steam locomotive exhaust systems
Steam locomotive technologies